The 2000 2. divisjon was the third highest football (soccer) league for men in Norway.

22 games were played in 8 groups, with 3 points given for wins and 1 for draws. Ørn-Horten, Mandalskameratene, Hødd and Aalesund were promoted to the First Division through playoffs against the other 4 group winners.

Because of the league being streamlined for the next season, more teams than usual—number nine, ten, eleven and twelve—were relegated to the 3. divisjon. The winning teams from each of the 24 groups in the 3. divisjon faced some teams placed seven and eight (except for the three worst eight-place teams) in the 2. divisjon in three-way playoff matches, resulting in 10 playoff winners which stayed or were promoted to the 2. divisjon.

League tables

Group 1

Group 2

Group 3

Group 4

Group 5

Group 6

Group 7

Group 8

Promotion playoffs
To the First Division from the 2. divisjon

To the 2. divisjon from the 3. divisjon

References
Fixtures, tables and playoffs

Norwegian Second Division seasons
3
Norway
Norway